Torremocha de Ayllón is a village in Soria, Spain. It is part of the municipality of San Esteban de Gormaz.

References

Towns in Spain
Populated places in the Province of Soria